Charles Frederick Klusmann (born 7 September 1933) is a retired United States Navy combat pilot who was shot down over Laos during the Vietnam War and later escaped captivity.

Military career

Shootdown, capture and escape
He was a navy Lieutenant (O-3) when he was shot down over the Plain of Jars, Laos on 6 June 1964 flying an RF-8A Crusader aircraft from the VFP-63, . He was the first airman shot down and captured by the Pathet Lao and the first to escape three months later on August 30, "First in, first out". He was rescued two days later by CIA Officer Terrence Michael "Terry" Burke. This is notable because the United States government never negotiated for the release of any prisoners held in Laos, and so, not one American held in Laos was ever released.

Awards and decorations 
Klusmann's military awards and decorations include:

 - Distinguished Flying Cross
 - Prisoner of War Medal

His Distinguished Flying Cross Citation reads:

Personal life and retirement 
Klusmann retired from the Navy as a captain in 1980. A  father of two children and a grandfather of three, he retired to Pensacola, where he went to flight school in 1996.

See also 

 List of people from San Diego, California
 U.S. prisoners of war during the Vietnam War

References

External links 
 Story of the mission where Klusmann was shot down - from POW-Network.org

Recipients of the Distinguished Flying Cross (United States)
United States Naval Aviators
Vietnam War prisoners of war
Military personnel from California
People from San Diego
1933 births
Living people
American Vietnam War pilots
United States Navy personnel of the Vietnam War
Shot-down aviators